Bousfield is a surname, and may refer to:

Aldridge Bousfield (1941–2020), American mathematician and writer
Henry Brougham Bousfield (1832–1902), colonial Anglican priest and Bishop of Pretoria
Ian Bousfield (born 1964), British trombonist
John Keith Bousfield (1893–1945), British army officer, businessman and member of the Legislative Council of Hong Kong
Ken Bousfield (1919–2000), British golfer
Maudelle Brown Bousfield (1885–1971), American educator
Nathaniel Bousfield (1829–1883), English MP
Weston Bousfield (1904–1986), American psychologist and professor
William Robert Bousfield (1854–1943), British lawyer, politician and scientist